Luiza Borac is a Romanian classical pianist.

Life 

In 2012, Borac recorded several world premiere recordings with Jaime Martin and the Academy of St Martin in the Fields of works by the pianist and composer Dinu Lipatti. The double CD was awarded 5 stars by the BBC Music Magazine and 6 stars by the magazine  as the best CD of the double month.

In March 2014, Borac received her doctorate from the Faculty of Musicology at the University of Bucharest on the piano works of George Enescu with the final grade summa cum laude.

Borac teaches piano at the Hanover Music School.

In 2019, the pianist played the world premiere of George Enescu's 1897 unfinished Concerto for Piano and Orchestra at the Sala Radio of the Romanian Radio Broadcasting Company: Compus de ENESCU la Paris, la doar 16 ani: Concertul pentru pian și orchestră cântat prima oară la Sala Radio! (in Romanian language), article on the page orchestreradio.ro [without date], last accessed on 20 December 2019</ref>

Awards 
Borac is the winner of more than 30 national and international awards,
Including:
 1st prize in the Felix Mendelssohn Bartholdy Prize of the Stiftung Preußischer Kulturbesitz, Berlin,
 1st prize at the International Music Competition Viotti-Valsesia, Italy
 Silver medal at the Gina Bachauer International Piano Competition in Salt Lake City
 Debut prize of Carnegie Hall, in New York City
 the Prix d'Oslo, the Grieg Prize and the Audience Prize at the Edvard Grieg International Piano Competition in Oslo
 2007: Music Award of the BBC
In 1995, she was a prize winner of the Holland Music Sessions Concert Artists.

Recordings 
 Robert Schumann – Kinderszenen, Etudes Symphoniques op. 13 (Avie)
 Erbdrostenhof – Klavierabend mit Werken von Chopin, Liszt und Ravel (R+V)
 Ceszky Krmlov Festival – Klavierabend mit Werken von Beethoven und Schumann
 Glasgow International Piano Competition – Prizewinner Concert
 Gina Bachauer International Piano Competition – Prizewinner Concert
 WDR Orchester Köln – Chopin Variations op. 2 'La ci darem la mano' (BMG)
 George Enescu – The Three Piano Suites (Avie)
 Wanderer – Schubert and Liszt (Avie)
 Don Giovanni – Chopin, Liszt, Beethoven (ZEIT-Stiftung)
 George Enescu – The Two Piano Sonatas (Avie)
 Frédéric Chopin – 24 Etudes and 6 Polish Songs (Avie)
 Frühlingsglaube – Piano Transcriptions by Liszt and Rachmaninoff
 2012: Piano Music of Dinu Lipatti, Aufnahme mit der Academy of St. Martin in the Fields, Portsmouth: Avie Records
 2014: Chants Nostalgiques, mit Werken von Leopold Godowsky, Fritz Kreisler, Sergei Rachmaninov, Franz Schubert, Franz Liszt, Constantin Silvestri, Francisco Tárrega, Robert Schumann, Richard Strauss, Tiberiu Brediceanu und Gheorghe Dima sowie eine Hommage an Ion Buzea, Portsmouth: Avie Records
 2017: Inspirations & dreams, Booklet und 2 CDs mit Werken von George Enescu, Maurice Ravel, Marcel Mihalovici, Pablo de Sarasate, Claude Debussy und Robert Schumann, Neuhausen auf den Fildern: Profil Medien
 2019: Mozart in Love, Profil Medien

References 
 : Rumänischer Barock / Dinu Lipatti ist als Pianist eine Legende. Nun sind endlich auch seine faszinierenden Kompositionen zu hören. Rezension in the Kulturspiegel, Kulturbeilage der Zeitschrift Der Spiegel, Ausgabe 1/2013 dated 31 December 2012, ; auch als PDF-Dokument

Notes

External links 

 
 
 

Romanian classical pianists
Romanian music educators
Date of birth unknown
Living people
People from Pitești
Year of birth missing (living people)